The women's heptathlon event at the 2011 Summer Universiade was held on 19–20 August.

Medalists

Results

100 metres hurdles
Wind:Heat 1: +1.8 m/s, Heat 2: -0.3 m/s, Heat 3: +0.1 m/s

High jump

Shot put

200 metres
Wind:Heat 1: -0.3 m/s, Heat 2: -0.2 m/s, Heat 3: -1.4 m/s

Long jump

Javelin throw

800 metres

Final standings

References
100 metres hurdles results
High jump Group A results
High jump Group B results
Shot put Group A results
Shot put Group B results
200 metres results
Long jump Group A results
Long jump Group B results
Javelin throw Group A results
Javelin throw Group B results
800 metres results

Heptathlon
2011 in women's athletics
2011